The 1950 Soviet Cup was an association football cup competition of the Soviet Union.

Competition schedule

Preliminary round
 [Sep 29] 
 Dinamo Stepanakert               0-2  PISHCHEVIK Odessa 
   [B.Chubinskiy-2] 
 [Oct 1] 
 DINAMO Yerevan                   3-0  Spartak Makharadze 
   [Ilya Mkrtchan, Amazasp Mkhoyan, ?] 
 [Oct 15] 
 Burevestnik Frunze               0-5  KRASNOYE ZNAMYA Ivanovo 
 Dinamo Petrozavodsk              1-6  BUREVESTNIK Kishinev 
 TRAKTOR Taganrog                 2-1  Spartak Tbilisi 
   [Sysoyev, Kutushov - ?]

First round
 [Sep 30] 
 Spartak Uzhgorod                 0-1  TORPEDO Stalingrad 
 [Oct 1] 
 Burevestnik Bendery              1-7  DINAMO Minsk 
 Dinamo-2 Leningrad               1-7  VMS Moskva 
 DO Novosibirsk                   5-0  Spartak Ashkhabad 
   [V.Zvonaryov-3, Alyoshin, Kuchanov] 
 METALLURG Zaporozhye             5-0  Lokomotiv Petrozavodsk 
   [Y.Sytnik-2, P.Ponomaryov, O.Kiknadze, S.Vasilyev] 
 TRUDOVIYE REZERVY Frunze        17-0  Pishchevik Chuy Region 
 Zavod Mashinostroyeniya Tashkent 0-4  TRAKTOR Taganrog  
 [Oct 4] 
 Inkaras Kaunas                   1-3  DINAMO Kiev 
   [Skelovas 35 – Dezideriy Tovt 15, 81, Mikhail Koman 54 pen] 
 [Oct 8] 
 Dinamo Jambul                    1-2  NEFTYANIK Baku 
   [Shchogol – Alekper Mamedov, Valentin Khlystov] 
 Krasnoye Znamya Ivanovo          1-2  DINAMO Yerevan 
   [A.Yeryomin 25 – Vladimir Bogdanovich 49, Ilya Mkrtchan 80] 
 [Oct 10] 
 Pishchevik Odessa                1-1  Burevestnik Kishinev 
   [B.Chubinskiy – Khodin] 
 TRUDOVIYE REZERVY Charjou        w/o  Bolshevik Stalinabad

First round replays
 [Oct 11] 
 Pishchevik Odessa                0-2  BUREVESTNIK Kishinev

Second round
 [Sep 28] 
 Krasnoye Znamya Leninakan        0-3  LOKOMOTIV Moskva 
 [Oct 1] 
 Kirovakan                        0-1  DZERZHINETS Chelyabinsk 
 [Oct 2] 
 DINAMO Minsk                     w/o  TsvetMet Balkhash 
 Dinamo Stalinabad                0-4  BUREVESTNIK Kishinev 
 DO Petrozavodsk                  1-2  KALEV Tallinn 
 DO Sverdlovsk                    5-1  Spartak Vilnius 
   [B.Ivanov, I.Dominskiy, F.Koptelov, B.Vorobyov, V.Listochkin - ?] 
 DO Tbilisi                       5-3  CDKA-2 Moskva             [aet] 
 Krasnaya Armiya Stalinabad       0-1  TORPEDO Gorkiy 
   [Jesus Varela] 
 Trudoviye Rezervy Baku           3-3  Dinamo Leningrad 
 Zavod Mashinostroyeniya Tambov   1-7  LOKOMOTIV Kharkov 
   [? – Georgiy Borzenko-3, Vitaliy Zub-2, Pyotr Ponomarenko, Sergei Chizhov] 
 [Oct 3] 
 DINAMO Tallinn                   5-3  Dinamo Alma-Ata 
   [A.Sepp-2, U.Pillu-2, Vakemets – A.Mezhov, ?, ?] 
 DO Ashkhabad                     1-5  KRYLYA SOVETOV Kuibyshev 
 DO Riga                          1-2  DINAMO Tbilisi            [aet] 
   [Mikhail Kuzmin 63 – Avtandil Gogoberidze 83 pen, Georgiy Antadze 98] 
 Krasny Metallurg Liepaja         0-3  TORPEDO Moskva 
   [Yuriy Chaiko, Antonin Sochnev, Alexandr Ponomaryov] 
 Torpedo Minsk                    2-3  DAUGAVA Riga 
   [? – Yuriy Shebilov ?, Maks Levitanus ?, 75 pen] 
 Trud Kishinev                    0-10 SHAKHTYOR Stalino 
   [Viktor Fomin-3, Leonid Savinov-2, N.Vardimiadi, Viktor Kolesnikov, Dmitriy Ivanov, ?, ?] 
 [Oct 4] 
 DO Minsk                        10-1  Trudoviye Rezervy Charjou 
 Elnias Siauliai                  2-3  DO Tashkent 
 [Oct 5] 
 Dinamo Tashkent                  0-8  VVS Moskva 
   [Sergei Korshunov-2, Alexandr Obotov-2, Spartak Jejelava-2, Viktor Fyodorov, Nikolai Morozov] 
 [Oct 8] 
 Metallurg Zaporozhye             2-3  TORPEDO Stalingrad 
   [G.Sushkov 15, P.Ponomaryov 19 – Klimov 42, ?, Yuriy Belousov ?] 
 [Oct 9] 
 DO Novosibirsk                   4-1  Trudoviye Rezervy Frunze 
   [Zvonaryov-2, Bystrov, Kuchanov – Zhigalkin] 
 VMS Moskva                       3-1  Neftyanik Baku 
   [Nikolai Shkatulov-2, Mikhail Didevich - ?] 
 [Oct 10] 
 KBF Tallinn                      2-4  DINAMO Kiev 
   [A.Goryachev 44, Y.Yefimenko 90 – Georgiy Ponomaryov 2, 62, Dezideriy Tovt 64, Mikhail Koman 80] 
 [Oct 15] 
 DINAMO Yerevan                   5-2  Traktor Taganrog          [aet] 
   [Ilya Mkrtchan 22, 75, ?, Viktor Merkulov 96, Vladimir Bogdanovich 99 – Sysoyev 19, Kutushov 35]

Second round replays
 [Oct 3] 
 Trudoviye Rezervy Baku           1-4  DINAMO Leningrad

Third round
 [Oct 8] 
 Daugava Riga                     0-1  LOKOMOTIV Moskva 
   [Yevgeniy Bologov 86 pen] 
 [Oct 10] 
 DINAMO Tbilisi                   3-1  Torpedo Moskva 
   [Mikhail Jojua 4, Nikolai Todria 32, Boris Paichadze 75 – Viktor Ponomaryov 90 pen] 
 DO Sverdlovsk                    1-0  Dinamo Leningrad 
   [Zykin] 
 Dzerzhinets Chelyabinsk          0-2  VVS Moskva 
   [Viktor Shuvalov, Sergei Korshunov] 
 KRYLYA SOVETOV Kuibyshev         1-0  DO Tbilisi 
   [Alexandr Gulevskiy 36] 
 SHAKHTYOR Stalino                2-1  Torpedo Gorkiy 
   [Viktor Kolesnikov 68, Leonid Savinov 87 – Alexandr Denisov 53] 
 [Oct 11] 
 KALEV Tallinn                    3-0  Dinamo Tallinn 
 Lokomotiv Kharkov                0-2  DO Tashkent 
   [S.Yazvetskiy 14, Khuduridi 37] 
 [Oct 15] 
 TORPEDO Stalingrad               3-1  DO Minsk 
 [Oct 20] 
 Dinamo Kiev                      2-3  DINAMO Yerevan 
   [Dezideriy Tovt 10, Georgiy Ponomaryov 15 – Vladimir Bogdanovich 42, 65, Ilya Mkrtchan 84] 
 DINAMO Minsk                     2-1  DO Novosibirsk 
   [? – Zvonaryov 60 pen] 
 [Oct 22] 
 VMS Moskva                       2-3  BUREVESTNIK Kishinev 
   [Yevgeniy Gorbunov, P.Petrov pen – V.Khodin-2, ?]

Fourth round
 [Oct 15] 
 Krylya Sovetov Kuibyshev         0-0  DO Tashkent 
 [Oct 16] 
 KALEV Tallinn                    2-1  DO Sverdlovsk 
   [Juba, Kilk – D.Ivanov] 
 LOKOMOTIV Moskva                 3-1  Shakhtyor Stalino 
   [Yevgeniy Bologov 13, 86, Vasiliy Panfilov 66 – Leonid Savinov 63] 
 [Oct 17] 
 VVS Moskva                       2-1  Dinamo Tbilisi 
   [Alexei Anisimov 44, 68 – Nikolai Todria 59] 
 [Oct 23] 
 CDKA Moskva                      2-1  Torpedo Stalingrad 
   [Vyacheslav Solovyov 37, Valentin Nikolayev 88 – Yuriy Nyrkov (C) 39 og] 
 [Oct 24] 
 DINAMO Moskva                    7-0  Dinamo Yerevan 
   [Sergei Solovyov 13, 56, 66, Konstantin Beskov 43, 50 pen, 53, Vasiliy Trofimov 82] 
 ZENIT Leningrad                  3-1  Dinamo Minsk              [aet]  
   [Alexandr Ivanov 21, Lazar Kravets 95, Friedrich Maryutin ? – Nikolai Barmashov 46] 
 [Oct 25] 
 SPARTAK Moskva                   7-0  Burevestnik Kishinev 
   [Nikolai Dementyev 5, 30, Viktor Terentyev 10, 25, Nikita Simonyan 15, 70, Alexei Paramonov 20]

Fourth round replays
 [Oct 16] 
 Krylya Sovetov Kuibyshev         0-0  DO Tashkent 
 [Oct 18] 
 KRYLYA SOVETOV Kuibyshev         2-0  DO Tashkent 
   [Alexandr Gulevskiy 36, 37]

Quarterfinals
 [Oct 23] 
 VVS Moskva                       0-1  KRYLYA SOVETOV Kuibyshev         
   [Alexandr Gulevskiy] 
 [Oct 26] 
 CDKA Moskva                      2-0  Kalev Tallinn 
   [Valentin Nikolayev 17, ?] 
 [Oct 27] 
 DINAMO Moskva                    3-2  Lokomotiv Moskva          [aet] 
   [Sergei Solovyov 71, Ivan Konov 97, Vladimir Savdunin 106 – Boris Lagutin 10, Boris Pirogov 118] 
 [Oct 28] 
 SPARTAK Moskva                   3-1  Zenit Leningrad 
   [Alexandr Rystsov 15, Alexei Paramonov 50, Nikita Simonyan 57 – Lazar Kravets 34]

Semifinals
 [Oct 31] 
 DINAMO Moskva                    7-0  Krylya Sovetov Kuibyshev 
   [Sergei Salnikov 33, Sergei Solovyov 46, 70, 84, Vasiliy Trofimov 55, Konstantin Beskov 62, 74] 
 [Nov 1] 
 SPARTAK Moskva                   4-0  CDKA Moskva 
   [Nikolai Dementyev 53 pen, Nikita Simonyan 82, 89, Nikolai Parshin 85]

Final

External links
 Complete calendar. helmsoccer.narod.ru
 1950 Soviet Cup. Footballfacts.ru
 1950 Soviet football season. RSSSF

Soviet Cup seasons
Cup
Soviet Cup
Soviet Cup